Presidential elections were held in El Salvador on 12 January 1915. Carlos Meléndez Ramirez was the only candidate, and was elected unopposed.

Results

References

Bibliography
Callardo, Ricardo Las constituciones de El Salvador I-II. Madrid: Ediciones Cultura Hispanica. 1961.
Garcia, Miguel Angel Diccionario Histórico Enciclopédico de la República de El Salvador. Vol. II San Salvador 1928.
Larde y Larín, Jorge Guía Histórica de El Salvador San Salvador: Ministerio de Culture. 1958.
Vidal, Manuel Nociones de historia de Centro América San Salvador: Ministerio de Educación. Ninth edition. 1970.
Webre, Stephen José Napoleón Duarte and the Christian Democratic Party in Salvadoran Politics 1960-1972 Baton Rouge: Louisiana State University Press. 1979.

El Salvador
Presidential elections in El Salvador
1915 in El Salvador
Single-candidate elections
Election and referendum articles with incomplete results